Dichomeris rurigena is a moth in the family Gelechiidae. It was described by Edward Meyrick in 1914. It is found in Guyana.

The forewings are brown with a small blackish spot at the base of the costa. The discal stigmata is minute, dark fuscous, with a faint hardly paler slightly bent shade from four-fifths of the costa to the tornus. There is also a terminal series of minute dark fuscous dots. The hindwings are rather dark grey.

References

Moths described in 1914
rurigena